Hussein Alaa Hussein (Arabic: حسين علاء حسين, born August 4, 1987 in Baghdad, Iraq) is an Iraqi football player. He played with clubs in Asia and Africa. Hussein usually plays in the defender position.

Career
Hussein Alaa Hussein made his name as the star performer in Iraq’s U-17s side managed by Nasrat Nassir and was chosen the best player in Asian Championship qualifiers in Qatar Doha in 2008. His performances earned him an offer of a contract and a chance to gain UAE nationality to play for Al-Ain. The defender spent time in the Emirates having getting a visa through Iraqi coach Jamal Salih, then supervisor of the youth section at Al-Sharjah, but he returned to Iraq to continue his career. He had caught the eye playing for the club against a Russian club and Al-Karama of Syria.

Hussein joined Qingdao Jonoon in July 2009 and became the first Iraqi footballer in Chinese football league. He scored first goal for Qingdao on August 22, 2009 with 2–1 win over Changsha Ginde. He transferred to Shenzhen Ruby on 28 February 2010.

In 2014,he has signed a 6-month-long contract with Malaysian Super League club Kelantan FA.

Honours (Individual) 
Was chosen to be the best professional player 2013 year in Thailand, to be within 11 player Thailand Star to match against English Premier League champion Chelsea, then coached by Mourinho.
The first professional player to Iraqi and Arab plays and he plays and scores 3 goals for Chinese Super League year 2010.
One of three Iraqi professional players playing in the Asia Cup for Club Professional League year 2009.
Was chosen to be the best professional Foreign player in Morocco Premier League for the year 2008.
Was chosen to be the best player in The Asian Championship that was held in Qatar – Doha for the year 2008.

References 

1987 births
Iraqi expatriate footballers
Iraqi footballers
Living people
People from Kut
Al-Zawraa SC players
Qingdao Hainiu F.C. (1990) players
Shenzhen F.C. players
Chinese Super League players
Expatriate footballers in China
Fath Union Sport players
Expatriate footballers in Morocco
Expatriate footballers in Thailand
UAE Pro League players
Association football defenders
Borneo F.C. players
Al-Nasr SC (Dubai) players
Expatriate footballers in the United Arab Emirates
Sharjah FC players
Zakho FC players
Al-Quwa Al-Jawiya players
Hussein Alaa Hussein
Kelantan FA players
Expatriate footballers in Malaysia